Mode 7  is a graphics mode on the Super Nintendo Entertainment System video game console.

Mode 7 may also refer to:

 Mode 7 Games, a British video game developer and publisher
 Mode 7, the Teletext-compatible video mode available on the BBC Micro, noted for its colorful, blocky pseudo-graphics
 The Game Boy division of the Cracking Group Fairlight